A 25–Year Celebration Tour was the twenty-fifth concert tour by Santana in 1991, celebrating their 25th anniversary as a band.

Tour band 
 Alex Ligertwood – lead vocals, rhythm guitar (through April)
 Tony Lindsay – lead vocals (beginning April)
 Carlos Santana – lead guitar, percussion, vocals
 Chester D. Thompson – keyboards
 Benny Rietveld – bass guitar
 Walfredo Reyes Jr. – drums (through April)
 Gaylord Birch – drums (from April to June)
 Billy Johnson – drums (beginning June)
 Raul Rekow – congas, bongos, percussion, vocals
 Karl Perazzo – timbales, percussion, vocals (beginning April)

Set list 
The tour began on January 19 at the Rock in Rio II festival within the Maracanã Stadium in Rio de Janeiro, Brazil and ended on November 3 at a Bill Graham memorial concert at the Polo Fields in San Francisco, California. This is an average set list of this tour:

 "Mandela" (Armando Peraza)
 "It's a Jungle Out There" (Carlos Santana)
 "Somewhere in Heaven" (Alex Ligertwood, Santana)
 "Life Is for Living" (Pat Sefolosha)
 "Batuka" (José Areas, David Brown, Michael Carabello, Gregg Rolie, Michael Shrieve)
 "No One to Depend On" (Carabello, Coke Escovedo, Rolie, Willie Bobo, Melvin Lastie)
 "We Don't Have to Wait" (Santana, Armando Peraza, Thompson)
 "Black Magic Woman" (Peter Green)
 "Gypsy Queen" (Gábor Szabó)
 "Oye Como Va" (Tito Puente)
 "Right On" (Marvin Gaye, Earl DeRouen)
 "Peace on Earth...Mother Earth...Third Stone from the Sun" (John Coltrane, Santana, Jimi Hendrix)
 "Save the Children" (Bobby Womack)
 "Savor" (Areas, Brown, Carabello, Rolie, Santana, Shrieve)
 "Blues for Salvador" (Santana, Chester D. Thompson)
 "Europa (Earth's Cry Heaven's Smile)" (Tom Coster, Santana)
Encore
 "Jin-go-lo-ba" (Babatunde Olatunji)

Tour dates

Brazilian leg (January 19–24)

U.S. leg (April 27 – May 11)

Japan leg (May 15–22)

U.S. leg (May 25–26)

Aruban show (June 16)

North American leg (June 20–28)

European leg (July 7–27)

North American leg (August 30 – November 3)

Box office score data

Notes

References

External links 
 Santana Past Shows 1991 at Santana official website

Santana (band) concert tours
1991 concert tours
Concert tours of North America
Concert tours of South America
Concert tours of Europe
Concert tours of Japan